Crassispira guildingii is a species of sea snail, a marine gastropod mollusk in the family Pseudomelatomidae.

Description
The length of the shell varies attains 8 mm.

The whorls are slightly concavely shouldered above, nodosely plicated beneath, transversely very closely striated. The color of the shell is very dark chocolate or blackish, interior same color.

Distribution
This marine species occurs off St. Vincent (Antilles) and the West Indies.

References

 Reeve, Lovell Augustus. Conchologia Iconica: Or, Illustrations of the Shells of Molluscous Animals: III. Reeve, 1845.
 Fallon P.J. (2011) Descriptions and illustrations of some new and poorly known turrids (Gastropoda: Turridae) of the tropical northwestern Atlantic. Part 3. Genus Crassispira Swainson, 1840, subgenus Crassiclava McLean, 1971. The Nautilus 125(2): 53–62.

External links
 
 Clathurella guildingii

guildingii
Gastropods described in 1845